Khlong Chak Phra is one of the six khwaengs (sub-districts) of Taling Chan District in Bangkok's Thonburi side.  It is the location of the district office.

Geography
It is named after Khlong Chak Phra, that currents through right side of the area and also a borderline with other districts. Geography of Khlong Chak Phra is long and thin, giving it a curve-like shape and the easternmost of the district, with a total area of 1.251 km2 (0.483 mi2). Most of the area consisting of lowlands along the waterways, therefore often flooding regularly.

Neighbouring sub-districts are (from the north clockwise): Taling Chan in its district, Arun Amarin, Bang Khun Non and Bang Khun Si of Bangkok Noi District, Khuha Sawan of Phasi Charoen District, Bang Phrom, Bang Ramat, and Chimphli in its district.

Transportation
The area is served by the Bang Ramat Railway Halt of the State Railway of Thailand (SRT), whose Southern Line passes beside Taling Chan Floating Market and Taling Chan District Office.

Local legend
Khlong Chak Phra has a legend about a ghost of a pregnant woman similar to Mae Nak Phra Khanong, named "Phi Yai Wan" (ผียายหวาน, "ghost of Mrs. Wan"). Like well-known a Mae Nak Phra Khanong who died while still pregnant, it is said that her spirit haunt people, including tuk-tuk or taxi drivers at night in many different ways, such as hail a cab, but then suddenly vanished mysteriously or hanging upside down from the tree. Believed that her story is true about the 1970–71. It is said that she was a local woman shot and killed because of jealousy by her husband on the railway side near the Taling Chan Junction and Wat Taling Chan. At present, there is still an old wooden boat preserved at Wat Champa in Bang Ramat, believed to be the boat of Yai Wan.

According to the confirmation of a man who experienced this event directly, he said it happened in 1975. A deceased woman named "Daeng Wan" (แดงหวาน), she was the person he regarded as sister-in-law. She died from being shot by her husband because of the misconception that she was a pestered fishing cat in the daybreak, and she died unknowingly. The boat is believed to belong to Yai Wan, it was actually his own boat that he dedicated to Wat Champa because it's a haunted boat. Every night nowadays, Daeng Wan's spirit still rows in a khlong beside Wat Champa.

Places of interest
Taling Chan Floating Market
Wat Chang Lek
Wat Taling Chan
Wat Paknam Fang Nuea
Song Khlong Floating Market

References

Taling Chan district
Subdistricts of Bangkok